Bowie at the Beeb is a compilation album by English singer-songwriter David Bowie, first released in 2000. Later editions contain only the first two CDs. The bonus disc was also released as a separate single CD entitled BBC Radio Theatre, London, June 27, 2000.

Releases
The first pressing mistakenly included the second (disc 2, track 13) version of the song "Ziggy Stardust" twice on disc two, missing the first (disc 2, track 5) version. EMI declined to issue corrected replacement discs to customers, instead mailing out one-song CDs of the first version.

This compilation also features a previously unreleased song, "Looking for a Friend" (disc 1, track 15), which John Peel said would be released as a single by Arnold Corns. The single was later cancelled.

The live tracks recorded in June 2000, included in this set on the bonus disc, were re-mastered and re-released in 2021 in the box set Brilliant Adventure (1992–2001), and was also expanded to include the full live set list on 2 CDs; the original release was a single disc and represented an edited recording of the show.

Track listing
All tracks written by David Bowie except as noted.

Disc One (May 1968 - June 1971)

Disc Two (September 1971 - May 1972)

Disc Three (27 June 2000, 'Hours')

Notes
Disc One
Tracks 1 to 4 recorded for John Peel in Top Gear as "David Bowie and the Tony Visconti Orchestra", tracks 1–3 broadcast .
Tracks 5 and 6 recorded for D.L.T. (Dave Lee Travis Show) as "David Bowie and Junior's Eyes", cut from  broadcast.
Tracks 7 to 12 recorded for The Sunday Show introduced by John Peel as "David Bowie and the Tony Visconti Trio (aka The Hype)", broadcast date .
Track 13 recorded for Sounds of the 70s: Andy Ferris as "David Bowie and the Tony Visconti Trio", broadcast date .
Tracks 14 to 18 recorded for In Concert: John Peel as "David Bowie and friends", broadcast date .

Disc Two
Track numbers below refer to the Japanese CD version of this album, which contains an exclusive track.
Tracks 1, 2 (Japan-only exclusive track), and 3 recorded for Sounds of the 70s: Bob Harris by David Bowie with Mick Ronson, broadcast date .
Tracks 4 to 8 recorded for Sounds of the 70s: Bob Harris as "David Bowie and The Spiders from Mars", broadcast date .
Tracks 9 to 13 recorded for Sounds of the 70s: John Peel as "David Bowie and The Spiders from Mars", broadcast date .
Tracks 14 to 17 recorded for Johnnie Walker Lunchtime Show as "David Bowie and The Spiders from Mars", broadcast date –.
Tracks 18 to 20 recorded for Sounds of the 70s: Bob Harris as "David Bowie and The Spiders from Mars", broadcast date .

Disc Three
Apparently recorded two days after headlining closing Sunday night set of Glastonbury Festival Pyramid Stage.

Personnel 
Track numbers below refer to the Japanese CD version of this album, which contains an exclusive track.
 David Bowie – vocals, guitar, keyboard
 The Tony Visconti Orchestra:
Herbie Flowers – bass
Barry Morgan – drums
John McLaughlin – guitar
Alan Hawkshaw – keyboards
 Tony Visconti – backing vocals
Steve Peregrin Took – backing vocals
 Junior's Eyes:
Mick Wayne – guitar
Tim Renwick – rhythm guitar
John "Honk" Lodge – bass
John Cambridge – drums
 The Tony Visconti Trio aka The Hype:
 Tony Visconti – bass
Mick Ronson – guitar
 John Cambridge – drums
 David Bowie and friends:
David Bowie – vocals, guitar, keyboards
Mick Ronson – guitar, vocal
Trevor Bolder – bass
Mick Woodmansey – drums
Mark Carr-Pritchard – guitar
George Underwood – vocal
Dana Gillespie – vocal
Geoffrey Alexander – vocal
 David Bowie and The Spiders from Mars (disc 2, tracks 4–20):
David Bowie – vocals, guitar
Mick Ronson – guitar, vocal
Trevor Bolder – bass
Woody Woodmansey – drums
 Disc 3, 27 June 2000:
David Bowie – Vocals
Earl Slick – guitar
Mark Plati - Guitar & Bass
Gail Ann Dorsey - Bass, Guitar & Vocals
Sterling Campbell - Drums
Mike Garson - Piano & Keyboards
Holly Palmer - Backing vocals & Percussion
Emm Gryner - Backing vocals & Keyboard

Additional personnel 
 Nicky Graham – piano on disc 2, tracks 9–20

Production personnel 
 Bernie Andrews – producer, disc 1 tracks 1–4, 13
 Pete Ritzema – engineer, disc 1 tracks 1–6, producer disc 2 tracks 9–13
 Alan Harris – engineer, disc 1 tracks 1–4
 Paul Williams – recording producer, disc 1 tracks 5–6
 Jeff Griffin – recording producer, disc 1 tracks 7–12, 14–18, disc 2 tracks 4–8, 18–20
 Tony Wilson – sound balance, disc 1 tracks 7–12
 Chris Lycett – assistant, disc 1 tracks 7–12, sound balance disc 1 tracks 14–18, disc 2 tracks 4–8, 18–20
 Nick Gomm – engineer, disc 1 track 13, disc 2 tracks 9–13
 John Etchells – assistant, disc 1 tracks 14–18, disc 2 tracks 4–8, 18–20
 John F. Muir – recording producer, disc 2 tracks 1–3
 John White – engineer, disc 2 tracks 1–3
 Bill Aitken – engineer, disc 2 tracks 1–3
 Roger Pusey – producer disc 2 tracks 14–17

Charts and certifications

Weekly charts

Year-end charts

Certifications

Notes 

BBC Radio recordings
David Bowie compilation albums
David Bowie live albums
2000 live albums
2000 compilation albums
EMI Records compilation albums
EMI Records live albums
Virgin Records compilation albums